w3m is a free software/open source text-based web browser and terminal pager. It has support for tables, frames, SSL connections, color, and inline images on suitable terminals. Generally, it renders pages in a form as true to their original layout as possible.

The name "w3m" stands for "", which is Japanese for "to see the WWW" where W3 is a numeronym of WWW.

, the original project appears to be inactive, while a currently maintained version exists and is packaged in various Linux distributions such as Debian and Fedora. This version is available from the repository of Debian developer Tatsuya Kinoshita.

The most notable feature is full keyboard navigability on everything. For instance, searching using Google can be done through the terminal. Links can be navigated using the arrow keys. Even gmail is navigable in the same manner.

In Emacs
w3m is also used by the Emacs text editor via the emacs-w3m.el Emacs Lisp module.

Forks
Two forks of w3m add support for multiple character-encodings and for other features not in the original:

 Hironori Sakamoto's w3m-m17n ("m17n" stands for multilingualization)
 Kiyokazu Suto's w3mmee ("mee" stands for "Multi-Encoding Extension")

See also 

 Eww (web browser)
 Emacs/W3
 Lynx (web browser)

References

External links

w3mmee official website
 currently (as of 2018–03) maintained version repository

Gopher clients
Windows web browsers
POSIX web browsers
Free web browsers
Text-based web browsers
Emacs
Emacs modes
Termcap
Software using the MIT license
1995 software
Terminal pagers